Hino River River in Tottori
Other tributary rivers
Hino River (Kanagawa)
Hino River (Fukui)
Hino River (Mie)
Hino River (Shiga)
Hino River (Yamaguchi)